Thomas James McEndoo  was Dean of Armagh from 1938 to 1955.

Hamilton was educated at Trinity College, Dublin and was ordained in 1888. After a curacy in Ballymore, he held incumbencies at Donaghendry and Drumglass. He was Prebendary of Mullaghbrack in Armagh Cathedral from 1915 to 1925; Treasurer from 1925 to 1927 and Precentor from 1927  to 1938.

References

Alumni of Trinity College Dublin
Deans of Armagh
19th-century Irish Anglican priests
20th-century Irish Anglican priests